The 2001 Crystal Skate of Romania was the 3rd edition of an annual senior-level international figure skating competition held in Romania. It was held between November 22 and 25, 2001 in Bucharest. Skaters competed in the disciplines of men's singles and ladies' singles.

Results

Men

Ladies

External links
 results

Crystal Skate Of Romania, 2001